WQPM (1300 AM) is a radio station airing a classic country format. Licensed to Princeton, Minnesota, United States, the station serves the St. Cloud area. The station is currently owned by Milestone Radio LLC.

History
On September 13, 2018, WQPM changed formats from oldies to classic hits, branded as "Killer Bee Radio".

On December 21, 2019, the station began stunting.
On January 1, 2020, the station returned to being known as The Big Q, playing oldies music.

On February 13, 2022, WQPM changed their format from oldies to a simulcast of classic country-formatted KLCI 106.1 FM Elk River, branded as "Total Country Bob FM". Big Q Radio, however, continues streaming oldies on the internet: Big Q Live, as well as on KDDG & KLCI 105.5 & 106.1 HD3.

References

External links

Radio stations in Minnesota
Radio stations established in 1967
Classic country radio stations in the United States